Charles Francis McGivern (March 1, 1915 – January 28, 1983) was a captain in the United States Navy.

His first Silver Star citation reads:

The President of the United States of America takes pleasure in presenting the Silver Star to Lieutenant Charles Francis McGivern (NSN: 0-81332), United States Navy, for gallantry and intrepidity in action against the enemy while serving as Assistant Approach Officer and Torpedo Data Computer Operator in the U.S.S. GATO (SS-212), during the FOURTH War Patrol of that Submarine from 13 January to 26 February 1943. Lieutenant McGivern performed his duties in an outstanding manner rendering inestimable assistance to his Commanding Officer in making six attacks in which 31,700 tons of enemy shipping were sunk and an unidentified vessel was damaged. Further, his devotion to duty throughout three previous War Patrols was of the highest order. His actions and conduct were in keeping with the highest traditions of the United States Naval Service.

His second Silver Star citation reads:

The President of the United States of America takes pleasure in presenting a Gold Star in lieu of a Second Award of the Silver Star to Lieutenant Charles Francis McGivern (NSN: 0-81332), United States Navy, for conspicuous gallantry and intrepidity in action with the enemy. During the FIFTH, SIXTH, and SEVENTH War Patrols of the U.S.S. GATO (SS-212) from 19 March 1943 to 10 January 1944, in enemy controlled waters, he as Assistant Approach Officer, Navigator, and Executive Officer rendered inestimable assistance to his Commanding Officer and was largely instrumental in the sinking of three valuable enemy ships totaling 21,000 tons and the damaging of three others of 20,000 tons. His accurate and skillful navigation under the most hazardous conditions enabled his ship to accomplish several missions in enemy held territory, which contributed greatly to the success of Allied operations. In addition, on one occasion when an unexploded enemy depth charge was found on the deck of his vessel, he volunteered to examine and sketch for intelligence purposes even though he was under enemy gunfire at the time. With complete disregard for his personal safety he obtained valuable information from the enemy depth charge, using a Japanese prisoner to copy the markings. His actions throughout these patrols was in keeping with the highest traditions of the United States Naval Service.

His Legion of Merit with valor device citation reads:

The President of the United States of America takes pleasure in presenting the Legion of Merit with Combat "V" to Lieutenant Commander Charles Francis McGivern (NSN: 0-81332), United States Navy, for exceptionally meritorious conduct in the performance of outstanding services to the Government of the United States as Commanding Officer of the U.S.S. SEA DEVIL (SS-400) during a War Patrol of that Submarine during World War II. With great skill and determination, he launched a daring torpedo attack which sent an enemy freighter of approximately 2,500 tons to the bottom. In addition, three trawlers were sunk in a well conducted gun engagement. Twelve friendly aviators were rescued after an extremely thorough and persistent search while performing lifeguard duties. He skillfully evaded all enemy countermeasures and brought his ship back to port safely. His conduct throughout was an inspiration to his officers and men, and were in keeping with the highest traditions of the United States Naval Service. (Lieutenant Commander McGivern is authorized to wear the Combat "V".)

McGivern was born on March 1, 1915, in Kenosha, Wisconsin, and died on January 28, 1983. He graduated from the United States Naval Academy in 1938.

References

People from Kenosha, Wisconsin
Military personnel from Wisconsin
United States Navy officers
United States submarine commanders
Recipients of the Silver Star
Recipients of the Legion of Merit
United States Naval Academy alumni
United States Navy personnel of World War II
1915 births
1983 deaths